Konstantinos Filippidis (born 26 November 1986 in Athens) is a Greek pole vaulter. He won the gold medal at the 2014 World Indoor Championships and the silver medal at the 2017 European Indoor Championships. He took the sixth place at the 2012 Olympic Games in London.

Biography

Junior level

He was successful at the junior level, finishing fourth at both the 2003 World Youth Championships and the 2004 World Junior Championships and winning a silver medal at the 2005 European Junior Championships. In the same year, he won the silver medal at the 2005 Summer Universiade with a personal best jump of 5.75 metres. He also competed at the 2005 World Championships and the 2006 European Athletics Championships without qualifying for the final.

Suspension: 2007–09

In 2007 Filippidis was found guilty of etilephrine doping. The sample was delivered on 16 June 2007 in an in-competition test at the national athletics championships. He received an IAAF suspension from July 2007 to July 2009. He then successfully applied for a reduction in his ineligibility period and subsequently he was eligible to resume competition from the 16th of February 2009.

Comeback: 2010–2012

After his comeback in 2010, he improved his personal best and the national indoor record (5.70 m) and later took 4th place in the 2010 World Indoor Championships.

The following year he started the season with another national indoor record (5.72 m) and also reached the final of the 2011 European Indoor Championships, taking the 5th place. During the summer season, he took third place at the IAAF Diamond League in Paris with 5.68 m, second place with 5.72 m in the meeting at Jockgrim and won the Greek National Championship with a vault of 5.73 m. At the 2011 World Championships, he improved his season's best and took the 6th place with a vault of 5.75m, equaling his 2005 Greek record.

In the 2012 indoor season, Filippidis again broke the Greek national record with a vault of 5.75 m, while in the 2012 IAAF World Indoor Championships in Istanbul he once again reached the final, taking 7th place. Later on that summer, he was again 7th at the final of the 2012 Summer Olympics in London. After the Games, he twice improved the Greek record (first to 5.76 m and then finally to 5.80 m).

2013-2014 World Indoor Champion

On 2013 Filippídis took the first place in the World Challenge in Berlin. He managed a vault 5.70 metres on his third attempt.

Konstantinos Filippídis took the first place in the 2014 World Indoor Championships in Sopot. The Greek champion progressed through the final with no failures until the winning height of 5.80m, winning the world indoor title with a season’s best.

Personal bests

Competition record

1No mark in the final

See also
List of doping cases in athletics

References

External links

1986 births
Living people
Athletes from Athens
Greek male pole vaulters
Olympic athletes of Greece
Athletes (track and field) at the 2012 Summer Olympics
Athletes (track and field) at the 2016 Summer Olympics
World Athletics Championships athletes for Greece
Doping cases in athletics
Greek sportspeople in doping cases
Mediterranean Games gold medalists for Greece
Athletes (track and field) at the 2005 Mediterranean Games
Universiade medalists in athletics (track and field)
Mediterranean Games medalists in athletics
Universiade silver medalists for Greece
World Athletics Indoor Championships winners
Athletes (track and field) at the 2020 Summer Olympics